Peter Tait may refer to:

 Peter Tait (physicist) (1831–1901), Scottish mathematical physicist
 Peter Tait (footballer) (1936–1990), English professional footballer
 Peter Tait (mayor) (1915–1996), New Zealand politician
 Peter Tait (radio presenter) (1950–2002), English radio presenter
 Peter Tait (sport shooter) (born 1949), Australian Paralympian
 Peter Tait (rugby union) (1906–1980), Scottish rugby union player

See also
Tait (surname)